Giovanna Micol (born 18 April 1982 in Trieste) is an Italian sports sailor. At the 2008 and 2012 Summer Olympics, she competed in the Women's 470 class, crewing for helmsman Giulia Conti on both occasions.

References

External links
 
 
 

1982 births
Living people
Italian female sailors (sport)
Olympic sailors of Italy
Sailors at the 2008 Summer Olympics – 470
Sailors at the 2012 Summer Olympics – 470